Mario Piacenza was an Italian mountain climber, ethnologist and explorer.

In 1911 with J.J. Carrel and J. Gaspard reached the summit of the Matterhorn from the Furggen ridge.

In 1913 he organized and led an exploration of the Ladakh, reaching the summit of Kun (m 7.077) in the Indian Kashmir together with Borelli ed Gaspard, then the summit of the Z3 peak, naming it Cima Italia (Italia Peak, m 6189). During this expedition he took thousands of photographs of the regions visited and of their people, most of which collected in the book of Cesare Calciati, Spedizione Mario Piacenza, Himalaia Cashmiriano, Milano 1930.

Italian mountain climbers
Italian ethnologists
Year of death missing
Year of birth missing